Cal MacAninch (born 24 November 1963) is a Scottish actor, who is known for portraying the character of DI John Keenan in police drama HolbyBlue on BBC1 (from 2007–08). Other notable appearances were his roles as Mr Thackeray in the ITV period drama, Mr Selfridge, and Henry Lang in Downton Abbey, but he has played many leading roles in British television and film over the last 30 years.

Biography
MacAninch played Rowan Collins in Series 4 of the ITV drama series Wild at Heart. He returned to the show for its fifth series as a main cast member. He also played Tauren, a sorcerer in the BBC television series Merlin in the episode "To Kill the King". He starred in the 2001 BBC miniseries The Best of Both Worlds with Alice Evans. He appeared as Henry Lang, a valet, in the second series of Downton Abbey.

Family, personal life
MacAninch and his wife, actress Shauna Macdonald, have three daughters. MacAninch is a keen marathon runner.

Radio

Television 

web|url=https://www.bbc.co.uk/mediacentre/mediapacks/mayflies|title=Mayflies - Meet the cast and creatives behind the drama that 'discovers the joy and the costs of love' |website=bbc.co.uk/mediacentre|date=19 December 2022|accessdate=20 December 2022}}</ref>

Film

References

External links

 Works of Robert Burns, as read by MacAninch

1963 births
Living people
Scottish male radio actors
Scottish male television actors
Male actors from Glasgow